is a Shinto shrine in Hōfu, Yamaguchi Prefecture, Japan. It is one of the main shrines dedicated to Tenjin, the deified form of Sugawara no Michizane.

See also

Modern system of ranked Shinto shrines
Kitano Tenman-gū
Three Great Tenjin Shrines

References

External links
 Hofu Tenmangu (Official site)

Shinto shrines in Yamaguchi Prefecture
Important Cultural Properties of Japan
10th-century establishments in Japan
Sugawara no Michizane
Religious buildings and structures completed in 1958
Hōfu, Yamaguchi
Religious buildings and structures completed in 904
10th-century Shinto shrines
20th-century Shinto shrines
Tenjin faith
Beppyo shrines